The Citizen is a fictional character in James Joyce's novel Ulysses. He is an old Irish nationalist with xenophobic and anti-semitic views who engages in an argument with Leopold Bloom in Barney Kiernan's pub, ultimately throwing a biscuit tin at Bloom. He also appears in Stephen Hero, described as very stout, black-bearded, always wearing a wideawake hat and a long bright green muffler, with "the voice of an ox... he could be heard at a great distance, criticising, denouncing and scoffing."

"The Citizen" is an important figure in the "Cyclops" episode of the novel.  The character has been described as having characteristics not only of the mythological Cyclops, Polyphemus but also of the Irish epic figure Finn McCool. "The Citizen" is, in part, a satirical portrait of Irish nationalist (and Gaelic Athletic Association founder) Michael Cusack (1847–1906) and Joyce's portrayal operates to expose what one critic called the "xenophobic ideologies of radical Celticists".

See also
 List of Ulysses characters

Sources

Ulysses (novel) characters
Fictional Irish people
Literary characters introduced in 1918
Characters in novels of the 20th century